Frederick Johnston may refer to:

 Fred Johnston (baseball) (1899–1959), American baseball player
 Fred Johnston (writer) (born 1951), Irish poet, novelist, literary critic and musician
 Frederick Johnston (cricketer) (1915–1977), Australian cricketer
 Frederick Johnston (priest) (1911–2005), Archdeacon of Cork
 Frederick Austin Johnston (1909–1990), Australian businessman and political figure
 Frederick William Johnston (1872–1947), administrator in British India

See also 
 Frederick Johnstone (disambiguation)
 Frederick Johnson (disambiguation)